Salmo trutta fario, sometimes called the river trout, and also known by the name of its parent species, the brown trout, is a predatory fish of the family Salmonidae and a subspecies or morph of the brown trout species, Salmo trutta, which also includes sea trout (Salmo trutta trutta) and a lacustrine trout (Salmo trutta lacustris). Their back is olive-dark brown and silvery blue, red spots with light edges occur towards the belly, the belly itself is whitish yellow. They can live for up to 18 years.

Habitat 
River trout live in fast flowing, oxygen-rich, cool clear waters with gravel or sandy riverbeds. They occur across almost all of Europe, from Portugal to the Volga, with the exception of Central Anatolia and the Caucasus regions. They are found as far north as Lapland. They do not occur in Greece or on the islands of Corsica, Sardinia and Sicily.

River trout are very faithful to their habitat (i.e. they live only at one spot and do not migrate), leaving it only to reproduce. Even after being disturbed they will return to their traditional sites. The adult river trout requires its own territory. During the day it is hidden in the shadows of the river bank, facing upstream.

Depending on size and habitat, they feed mainly on insects and insect larvae that live in water, small fish such as bullhead, small crustaceans, snails and other water animals. Cannibalism has also been frequently observed among river trout. They are fast swimming predators, but in rivers and streams they will usually take prey that is being driven past by the current.

Reproduction 

River trout spawn between October and January in the northern hemisphere and between May and June in the southern hemisphere. The fish uses rapid fanning of the tail and caudal fin on a rock riverbed to make several shallow pits, into which about 1,000 to 1,500 reddish eggs, four to five millimetre wide, are laid. The fish larvae emerge after two to four months.

The river trout has a special significances as a host fish for the  glochidia of the freshwater pearl mussel.

Other forms 
Because trout live in habitats with fixed boundaries, in addition to the river trout, Salmo trutta fario, there are various other subspecies of Salmo trutta. See Species of Trout.

Hybrids 
The tiger trout (Salmo trutta fario × Salvelinus fontinalis) is a genetic cross between a river trout and a brook trout. It gets its name from its characteristic golden yellow markings. Tiger trout are sterile, despite male and female may be distinguished by their external markings. The female tiger trout does not develop any gonads. By contrast, male tiger trout develop testicles as well as secondary sex features such as kypes, humps, darker and thicker skin and a lighter fillet colouring during the spawning season.

Fishing 

In the past, European waterbodies were heavily and artificially stocked with rainbow trout, a native of America that grows more quickly and is less demanding of water quality. It is disputed whether this threatens the river trout. Today, it is bred in fishponds with almost the same rate of success as the rainbow trout, for food and for restocking rivers. To protect native species of fish, the stocking of rivers with non-native species has been restricted for several years.

River trout makes an excellent fish dish.

Angling 
River trout is very popular with anglers. It is frequently fished using artificial lures. Angling with natural lures (worms, maggots, grasshoppers) is discouraged in most rivers because it is difficult to throw those trout back that are below the minimum landing size uninjured, when they have ingested this food so quickly and deeply.

Fly rods are used to catch river trout. Medium-sized, wet and dry flies are thrown into streams with a rod of AFTMA Class 4-6 and are intended to mimic an emerging or egg-laying insect.
A spinning rod can also be used in some waters. For this purpose, a light spinning rod and various artificial lures, such as spoon lures and spinners are used. In using wobblers and rubber fish care should be taken because they are banned on some waterbodies or may only be used with restrictions.

Research use
The fish has been used as a bio-indicator species in freshwater systems due to their sensitive nature. They are a well-established ‘model organism’ in aquatic toxicology research, especially for heavy metal bioaccumulation.

References

Literature 
 Fritz Terofal: Süsswasserfische in europäischen Gewässern. Mit 200 farbigen Darstellungen von Fritz Wendler. Mosaik Verlag u. a., München u. a. 1984, .
 Alexander Kölbing, Kurt Seifert: So macht Angeln Spass. Mehr wissen – mehr fangen. 5., durchgesehene Auflage. BLV, München u. a. 1995, .
 Roland Gerstmeier, Thomas Romig: Die Süßwasserfische Europas. Für Naturfreunde und Angler. Kosmos, Stuttgart 1998, .

External links 

Salmo
Freshwater fish of Europe
Fish described in 1758
Taxa named by Carl Linnaeus
Morphas